Michael Jerrod Moore (born October 6, 1982), known professionally as Michael Arden, is an American actor, singer, musician, and theatre director.

Early life
Growing up in Midland, Texas, he was active in the Pickwick Players, Midland Community Theatre's youth performing company. He was a student at Trinity School, a college preparatory school in Midland. A Presidential Scholar in the arts, he received a scholarship to Interlochen Arts Academy as a theatre student, where he graduated in 2001. He was accepted on a full scholarship to the Juilliard School, where he was in the Drama Division's Group 34 (2001–2005). He left Juilliard in 2003 to join the Broadway revival company of the musical Big River.

Career

Theatre
Arden made his Broadway debut as Tom Sawyer in the 2003 Roundabout and Deaf West revival of Big River. He also starred opposite John Hill in the 2004 off-Broadway show Bare, a Pop Opera. In Summer 2005, he played Nick, a sexually promiscuous gay man in love with a shark, in Adam Bock's surreal play Swimming in the Shallows at New York's Second Stage Theatre.  He played the title character in Pippin for the World AIDS Day Broadway benefit concert in November 2004.  He starred in the new Twyla Tharp musical The Times They Are A-Changin' based on the music of Bob Dylan.The Times ran January 25 to March 5, 2006 at the Old Globe Theatre in San Diego, California and then on Broadway at the Brooks Atkinson Theatre from October 26, 2006 to November 19, 2006. 
[[File:Arden, Michael (2006).jpg|left|thumb|Arden performing with the cast of [[The Times They Are a-Changin' (musical)|The Times They Are a-Changin''']]  in 2006 at Broadway on broadway.]]
In 2007 he starred as John Robert in Ace, at the Old Globe Theatre from January 13 to February 18. In the summer of 2007 he toured Europe with Barbra Streisand as one of her "Broadway Boys." From July to September 2010 he played the lead role in a revival of Andrew Lloyd Webber's Aspects of Love at the Menier Chocolate Factory in London.

Arden's regional theatre credits include Pippin, God of Vengeance, Falsettoland, Tom Jones' Harold and Maude, West Side Story, Songs for a New World, The Common Pursuit and The Winter's Tale.

Beginning in October 2014, Arden played the role of Quasimodo in the new musical The Hunchback of Notre Dame at San Diego's La Jolla Playhouse. The production ran from October 26 - December 7, 2014 and at Paper Mill Playhouse from March 4-April 5, 2015.

Arden directed Deaf West Theatre's acclaimed Broadway revival of Spring Awakening. The production marked his return to Deaf West and featured a cast made up of both deaf and hearing actors, performed simultaneously in American Sign Language and English. The production began in a small theater near Los Angeles' Skid Row in September 2014, transferred to the Wallis Annenberg Center in Beverly Hills in May 2015, and finally transferred to Broadway, where it began previews September 8, 2015 and opened on September 27th, 2015 at the Brooks Atkinson Theatre. On May 3, 2016 Arden received a Tony Award nomination in the category Best Direction of a Musical for his work on the Spring Awakening revival.

Arden went on to direct the musical My Fair Lady at the Bay Street Theater in Southampton, New York in August 2016. He then returned as the first Artist-in-Residence at the Wallis Annenberg Center, where he directed productions of The Pride and Merrily We Roll Along, for which he earned a 2017 Ovation Awards nomination for Best Director of a Musical.

Arden directed the first Broadway revival of the musical Once on This Island, which began previews on November 9, 2017 and opened on December 3 at the Circle in the Square Theatre, where it ran until January 6, 2019. The acclaimed revival, noted for its gender fluid casting  and inspired staging, has been nominated for 7 Drama Desk Awards and eight Tony Awards, including a second Best Director Tony nomination for Arden. The cast includes Hailey Kilgore and Alex Newell in their Broadway debuts as Ti Moune and Asaka, Lea Salonga as Erzulie, and Merle Dandridge as Papa Ge.

Next, Arden directed Annie at the Hollywood Bowl in July 2018 for the venue's annual summer musical production, with a cast including Ana Gasteyer as Miss Hannigan, Lea Salonga as Grace Farrell, and Megan Hilty as Lily St Regis. Following this Arden was slated to direct Jefferson Mays in his one-man adaptation of Charles Dickens' A Christmas Carol at Los Angeles' Geffen Playhouse beginning October 2018. Michael Arden will direct the American premiere of the musical Maybe Happy Ending at the Alliance Theatre in Atlanta, GA in January 2020.

Television
He has appeared on ABC's Grey's Anatomy (episode "17 Seconds" as Neal Hannigan) and in Numb3rs for CBS. He was cast in the Fox show The Return of Jezebel James, which aired and was cancelled after three episodes in the spring of 2008. Arden had a recurring role in the NBC series Kings as Joseph, the secret boyfriend of the closeted gay heir to the throne, Prince Jack Benjamin. He also guest starred in an episode of The Closer as James Clark, a schizophrenic murder suspect, as well as guest starring in an episode of Bones as Harold Prescott. He will be starring alongside Radha Mitchell, Jeffrey Nordling, and John Heard in the new A&E drama The Quickening. Producers of The Good Wife  announced in August 2011 that Arden had been cast in a recurring role as a potential love interest for the recurring character Owen Cavanaugh (Dallas Roberts). He starred alongside Charlie Sheen in the FX series Anger Management.

Film
Having also worked in film, he is a featured actor in director Colin Spoelman's independent effort Underground, the story of five friends who become trapped inside a cave system deep below a mountain ridge in central Kentucky. Arden's more recent work included the 2011 movie Source Code, starring Jake Gyllenhaal. He also appeared as Kevin in the film Bride Wars. 

 Composing and writing 
As a composer, Arden has written several works, including Easter Rising, As You Like It, and Ripley.

 Theatre credits 

Filmography

 Awards and nominations 

 Personal life 
He was born to a very young mother who also struggled with drugs and alcohol. When he was two years old, his father died by suicide. Arden went on to live with his grandparents who raised him from a very young age in Midland, Texas. He remembers the moment he caught the acting bug when he was only four years old. His grandparents had taken him to see Sesame Street Live and he says there's a memorable picture of him in which he is just on the edge of his seat, absolutely mesmerized. "It's almost as if I'm trying to get on the stage," he says. He also found a great theatrical outlet through his community theater company called the Pickwick Players. Arden also found a mentor at the Episcopal school he attended, his English teacher, Shelly Wright. He says he asked his grandparents to let him build theatrical sets in their own garage.

Arden is gay. He first came out to his English teacher. But it took longer to tell his Southern Baptist grandparents. They both died in 2014.

Arden got engaged to fellow Broadway and TV actor Andy Mientus on June 23, 2014. He and Mientus had both planned proposals to each other the same day without the other knowing. They married on August 18, 2016, at Babington House, Somerset, England. They have been together since 2010. The two first met in 2006 during the opening night party of the Broadway show The Times They Are-a-Changin''', in which Arden was a performer.

See also
 LGBT culture in New York City
 List of LGBT people from New York City

References

External links
 
 
 Playbill.com

1982 births
Living people
21st-century American male actors
Male actors from Texas
American male musical theatre actors
American male stage actors
American male television actors
American gay actors
American gay musicians
LGBT people from Texas
Interlochen Center for the Arts alumni
Juilliard School alumni
People from Midland, Texas
American theatre directors
20th-century American LGBT people
21st-century American LGBT people